The 1984–85 Nationale A season was the 64th season of the Nationale A, the top level of ice hockey in France. 12 teams participated in the league, and Sporting Hockey Club Saint Gervais won their fifth league title. Hockey Club de Caen was relegated to the Nationale B.

First round

 (* ASG Tours had five points deducted.)

Final round

Relegation round

External links
Season on hockeyarchives.info

Fra
1984–85 in French ice hockey
Ligue Magnus seasons